Fédérale 3 is the seventh division of rugby union in France. The competition involves 226 clubs in 21 pools of 8, and winners can progress up into higher division of competition. The competition above Fédérale 3 is Fédérale 2 and above that, Fédérale 1. Above the Fédérale divisions are the National leagues Nationale 2 and Nationale and above those, the two professional leagues, Rugby Pro D2 and the highest, the Top 14.

Results
 2001 Marseille Provence XV (Marseille)
 2003 Avenir Bizanos (Bizanos)
 2004 Cercle Amical Lannemezanais (Lannemezan)
 2005 Stade Bagnérais (Bagnères-de-Bigorre)
 2006 US Casteljalousaine (Casteljaloux)

External links
 Rugby Fédérale

5